Pakaʻalana heiau was an ancient Hawaiian temple (heiau) complex, sanctuary and refuge (puʻuhonua) in Waipio Valley where the God Lono was worshipped, which became the religious center on the Island of Hawaii dating back before the time of Liloa or his sons Hakau and ʻUmi-a-Līloa. It was also the site of Hale o Liloa that held a statue of the god in a corner of the structure and bones of ancient Native Hawaiians who were revered as gods. The complex is said to have had a six-foot carved stone statue of Liloa. The temple is located in the old district of Hamakua Here, Kiha killed the leader of a bandit clan named Ika, along with his companions as a sacrifice.

Origins

According to Winona Beamer, known as Aunty Nona, Waipio Valley has had; "An aura of enchantment, of mysticism" since 1415 when the "puʻuhonua" or "place of refuge" called Pakaʻalana was built. She recalls that the area is associated with the Goddess Hiʻiaka who fought a legendary battle at the mouth of Waipio Valley with Makaʻukiu and that the area is chosen by the Hawaiian gods as a place to keep a constant watch which was guarded by cliff spirits.

First royal mausoleum

Prior to the Westernized tombs of the Hawaiian Royalty such as Mauna Ala, there were only two ancient heiau designated as royal tomb enclosures, both on Hawaii Island, Hale o Keawe being one and Hale o Liloa being the first.

Liloa had named his first born son Hakau as his heir however, he left the war god and the care of Pakaʻalana heiau to his lesser ranking son Umi. Hakua, already jealous and unhappy with Umi's presence became so enraged, Umi was forced into exhile in Hilo. After the death of his father, Hakau builds a temple and names it the Halo o Liloa (House of Liloa) and inters the bones of Liloa there. In 1828–29, Kuhina Nui (Regent) Kaʻahumanu visited the Waipio Valley and took the kaʻai (funerary basket) of Liloa and Lono-i-ka-Makahiki and had them hidden at Kaawa-loa in a cave. The remains were moved again in 1858 and finally interred at Muana Ala in 1865 along with other aliʻi (nobles) from the Royal Tomb at Pohukaina.

References

Religious buildings and structures in Hawaii County, Hawaii
Heiau